McKnight Creek is a glacial meltwater stream,  long, flowing southwest from the snout of Commonwealth Glacier and entering the east end of Lake Fryxell between Lost Seal Stream and Aiken Creek, in Taylor Valley, Victoria Land, Antarctica. It was named by the Advisory Committee on Antarctic Names after research hydrologist Diane McKnight, leader of United States Geological Survey field teams over several years (1987–94) that made extensive studies of the hydrology and geochemistry of streams flowing into Lake Fryxell.

References

Rivers of Victoria Land
McMurdo Dry Valleys